Mount Hope is a summit in the U.S. state of Nevada.

Mount Hope (previously called Hope Mountain) was named after Samuel J. Hope.

References

Mountains of Eureka County, Nevada